The 1999 Illinois Fighting Illini football team represented the University of Illinois at Urbana–Champaign in the 1999 NCAA Division I-A football season. They participated as members of the Big Ten Conference. Their home games were played at Memorial Stadium in Champaign, Illinois. The team's head coach was Ron Turner. The team earned a MicronPC Bowl berth, and defeated Virginia, 63–21.

Schedule

Roster

References

Illinois
Illinois Fighting Illini football seasons
Cheez-It Bowl champion seasons
Illinois Fighting Illini football